Bright Joseph Egemasi Ogu was an Anglican bishop in Nigeria.

Ogu was educated at  the Theological College of Northern Nigeria. He was Bishop of Mbaise from 1999 to 2010, when he retired and was succeeded by Chamberlain Ogunado.

Notes

Living people
Anglican bishops of Mbaise
20th-century Anglican bishops in Nigeria
21st-century Anglican bishops in Nigeria
Year of birth missing (living people)